Phymorhynchus turris is a species of sea snail, a marine gastropod mollusk in the family Raphitomidae.

The Japanese name of this species is Seitaka-watazoko-shajiku.

Description

Distribution
The type locality of this marine species is off Cape Muroto, Nankai Trough, 32°21.3' N, 134°32.0' E, Japan, in hydrothermal vents at 3540 m.

References

External links
 

turris
Gastropods described in 2003